Bettayeb or Bettaieb is a surname. Notable people with the surname include:

 Maamar Bettayeb (born 1953), Algerian control theorist, educator, and inventor
 Riadh Bettaieb (born 1961), Tunisian politician

Arabic-language surnames